The 2013–14 Old Dominion Monarchs men’s basketball team represented Old Dominion University during the 2013–14 NCAA Division I men's basketball season. The Monarchs, led by first year head coach Jeff Jones, played their home games at Ted Constant Convocation Center and were first year members of the Conference USA. They finished the season 18–18, 9–7 in C-USA play to finish in sixth place. They advanced to the quarterfinals of the C-USA tournament to Middle Tennessee. They were invited to the College Basketball Invitational where they defeated South Dakota State and Radford to advance to the semifinals where they lost to Fresno State.

Pre-season

Departures

Incoming transfers

Incoming recruits

Roster

Schedule

|-
!colspan=12 style="background:#002B5F; color:#a8adb4;"| Exhibition

|-
!colspan=12 style="background:#002B5F; color:#a8adb4;"| Non-conference regular season

|-
!colspan=12 style="background:#002B5F; color:#a8adb4;"| Conference USA regular season

|-
!colspan=12 style="background:#002B5F; color:#a8adb4;"| Conference USA tournament

|-
!colspan=12 style="background:#002B5F; color:#a8adb4;"| College Basketball Invitational

Statistics
The team posted the following statistics:

References

Old Dominion Monarchs men's basketball seasons
Old Dominion
Old Dominion
Old Dominion
Old Dominion